Holne Ridge, on Dartmoor, includes some of southern Dartmoor's highest land. The ridge to the south west overlooks mires and bogs like Aune Head Mires. To the north east it overlooks the Dart Gorge with its many tors; Sharp Tor, for example. It also includes many notable features including:
Ryder's Hill - Highest point   on southern Dartmoor and includes Petre's Bound Stone and a trig Point on a small cairn
Horn's Cross - Ancient Cross
Puper's Hill - Cairns
Venford Reservoir - Reservoir supplying water to the Paignton area of south Devon
O Brook - Short tributary of the River Dart
Snowdon - Cairns
Sandy Way - Ancient track 
Holne Lee - Cairns
Wheal Emma Leat - Dry leat that used to supply water to copper mines near Buckfastleigh
Holne Moor Leat - Or Hamlyn's Leat. Used to supply water to a woollen mill near Buckfastleigh

References

Dartmoor
Ridges of England